Abul Kalam is a Bangladesh Nationalist Party politician and the former Member of Parliament of Narayanganj-5.

Career
Kalam was elected to parliament from Narayanganj-5 as a Bangladesh Nationalist Party candidate in 2001.

References

Bangladesh Nationalist Party politicians
Living people
8th Jatiya Sangsad members
People from Narayanganj District
5th Jatiya Sangsad members
6th Jatiya Sangsad members
Year of birth missing (living people)